Group C of the EuroBasket 2013 took place between 4 and 9 September 2013. The group played all of its games at Zlatorog Arena in Celje, Slovenia.

The group composed of Croatia, Czech Republic, Georgia, Poland, Slovenia and Spain. The three best ranked teams advanced to the second round.

Standings
|}

All times are local (UTC+2)

4 September

Georgia vs. Poland

Spain vs. Croatia

Czech Republic vs. Slovenia

5 September

Croatia vs. Georgia

Poland vs. Czech Republic

Slovenia vs. Spain

7 September

Spain vs. Czech Republic

Croatia vs. Poland

Georgia vs. Slovenia

8 September

Poland vs. Spain

Czech Republic vs. Georgia

Slovenia vs. Croatia

9 September

Georgia vs. Spain

Croatia vs. Czech Republic

Slovenia vs. Poland

External links
Standings and fixtures

Group C
2013–14 in Spanish basketball
2013–14 in Slovenian basketball
2013–14 in Croatian basketball
2013 in Polish sport
2013 in Georgian sport
2013 in Czech sport